The arms of the Flemish Community are: Or, a lion rampant sable, armed and langued gules. Although the lion has been in use for almost nine hundred years as the arms of the Count of Flanders, it only became the official symbol of the Flemish Community in 1973. At present its form and use is subject to the Decree of 7 November 1990.

Origin of the arms 

The Flemish lion derives from the arms of the Counts of Flanders. Their first appearance is on a seal of Count Philip of Alsace, dating from 1163. As such they constitute the oldest of the many territorial arms bearing a lion in the Low Countries. Still, Count Philip was not the first of his line to bear a lion, for his cousin, William of Ypres, already used a seal with a lion passant in 1158; and the shield on the enamel effigy of about 1155 from the tomb of his maternal uncle, Geoffrey Plantagenet, Count of Anjou, bears numerous lions rampant.

When the county of Flanders was inherited by the Dukes of Burgundy in 1405, the Flemish lion was placed on an escutcheon in their dynastic arms. It passed with the rest of the Burgundian inheritance to the House of Habsburg in 1482. The Habsburgs would bear the title and arms of the county of Flanders until 1795. As part of the claims and counterclaims resulting from War of the Spanish Succession, the Flemish lion likewise featured in the arms of Kings of Spain until 1931 and in the arms of the kingdom of the Two Sicilies until 1860.

In 1816 the Flemish lion became part of the coats of arms of the modern Belgian provinces of East Flanders and West Flanders that administer most of the territory of the former county.

It is the inverse of the arms of Brabant, which are a gold lion on a black field.

Symbol of the Flemish Movement 

Like many other nationalist movements, the Flemish movement sought and appropriated historical symbols as an instrument for rallying support. The choice of the Flemish lion was primarily based on the popular historical novel De leeuw van Vlaanderen (1838) of Hendrik Conscience, that forged the Battle of the Golden Spurs of 11 July 1302 into an icon of Flemish resistance against foreign oppression. It was enhanced even further when Hippoliet van Peene wrote the anthem De Vlaamse Leeuw in 1847. By the late nineteenth century it was customary for supporters of the Flemish movement to fly the Flemish lion on 11 July.

Symbol of the Flemish Community 

After gaining cultural autonomy in 1972, the then Cultuurraad van de Nederlandse Cultuurgemeenschap (Cultural Council of the Dutch Cultural Community) voted the decree of 22 May 1973 adopting the Flemish lion as its official flag. Shortly afterwards, the Cultuurraad also adopted a coat of arms: Or, a lion rampant sable, armed and langued gules, five mullets sabel in orle. The five stars surrounding the lion were meant to denote the five Flemish provinces. The inclusion of black stars caused a small controversy. Some objected to their colour, others regarded them as a needless Americanism. It was therefore suggested to replace them with a sheaf of arrows, an idea taken from the arms of the Netherlands. Notwithstanding the criticism, these arms were adopted by the Flemish Community (Decree of 30 March 1988) when it took over the attributions of the Cultuurraad. Shortly afterwards however it was decided to return to the original arms of Flanders (Decree of 7 November 1990), thereby making the arms identical to the flag. The Flemish lion has also become associated with the far right in the northern Netherlands.

Controversy over the claws 
There is discussion within the Flemish movement whether the tongue and claws of the Flemish lion should be red or black. This controversy originated when part of the Flemish movement started to take an increasingly anti-Belgian stand after the First World War. The radicalized resented that the colours of the Flemish lion echoed those of the Belgian flag and therefore propagated a black lion with black tongue and claws. The divide has remained ever since. Officially and historically the Flemish lion should have a red tongue and claws, and while both flags used to be more or less interchangeable until 1973 the entirely black lion has come to stand for the separatist or otherwise radical sections of Flemish nationalism in the eyes of many.

References

Bibliography 
 Ernest Warlop. Oude Vlaenderen en de zwarte leeuw op gouden veld, Miscellanea archivistica, 28 (1980) 5-52.
 Lieve Viaene and Ernest Warlop. Gemeentewapens in België: Vlaanderen en Brussel (Brussel, 2002) 1: 67-69.
 Hubert de Vries. Wapens van de Nederlanden: De historische ontwikkeling van de heraldische symbolen van Nederlanden, België, hun provincies en Luxemburg (Amsterdam, 1995) 64-65.

See also 

 Flag of Flanders
 Duchy of Jülich
 Arms of Sir John Welles, 1st Viscount Welles, KG

Flanders
Flanders
Flanders